Valat is a village in Wayanad district in the state of Kerala, India. It is the village situated near to Kannur district. There are two  Higher Secondary schools in the village. There is three  GV.LP School. The majority of the residents work in agriculture and business. Kabini River (one of the rivers in Kerala going towards the East) is a main attraction of this village. So other every body coming  here from nearest village and states . Also there are some good resorts and one park known as E3 Theme park. Gradually village is growing.

Demographics
As of the 2011 India census, Valat had a population of 10419 with 5277 males and 5142 females.

Health and Medicine
The State Government of Kerala has started a center for Tribal Medicine in this village. There is one public health center inside the town as well as one more private hospital available (24 hours) there. This village is famous for its traditional treatments run by tribal community.

See also 
 Mananthavady 
 Thondernad
 Vellamunda
 Nalloornad
Payyampally
Thavinjal
Vimalanager
Anjukunnu
Panamaram
Tharuvana
Kallody
Oorpally
Thrissilery

References

Villages in Wayanad district